Azad Nagar is a sub-urb and residential locality in Indore. It is situated at the banks of the Kahn River in Indore.

History
The area is one of the Muslim dominant and constitute 4 sectors from A to D, housing more than 200 houses in each. There are many high schools and madrasas in the locality.

The All India Radio Indore Station is located at Malwa House premises in Azad Nagar.

Geography
Azad Nagar lies adjacent to Radio Colony, Residency Area, Musakhedi and Samwad Nagar and borders the Kamla Nehru Zoo, Indore premises.

Politics
Azad Nagar area falls under the Indore-5 Assembly Constituency in Indore District. The current elected Member is Mahendra Hardia from the BJP.

The ward corporator is Foziya Sheikh Alim, who is also the Leader of Opposition in the Indore Municipal Corporation council.

Transport
The nearest railway station is Indore Junction railway station. Public transport such as autos, taxis, magic-vans, city buses are readily available.
Bus Routes passing by the main Gol Square are:-

Places of interest

Daly College: A premier school of Indore.
Kamla Nehru Prani Sangrahalay: The Zoo of Indore

References

Suburbs of Indore
Neighbourhoods in Indore